Stortorvet is a tram stop on the Oslo Tramway in Oslo, Norway. The station is located on the square Stortorvet in the city centre. It is served by the lines 17, 18 and 19. In 2009, it was decided to improve the square, the station and the tram tracks in the street. Stortorvet also has a balloon loop, so that trams terminating here can turn around.

References 

Oslo Tramway stations in Oslo